Haootia quadriformis is an extinct animal belonging to the Ediacaran biota. Estimated to be about 560 million years old, H. quadriformis is identified as a cnidarian polyp, and represents the earliest known evidence for muscle tissue in an animal. Discovered in 2008 from Newfoundland in eastern Canada, it was formally described in 2014. It is the first Ediacaran organism discovered to show fossils of muscle fibres. Structural examination of the muscles and morphology indicate that the animal is a cnidarian, though, which class H. quadriformis belongs to is currently undetermined.

Discovery and name 

The first fossil of Haootia was discovered from lower Fermeuse Formation of Back Cove, Bonavista Peninsula in Newfoundland. It was originally unearthed by Martin D. Brasier of the University of Oxford in 2008. However, the specimen was not allowed to be removed according to provincial law in Newfoundland, so that only a plaster cast was made. The cast (plastotype) is maintained in the collections of the Oxford University Museum of Natural History. The actual fossil specimen, or holotype, remains on the north shore of Back Cove, roughly 1.8 km NNW of Melrose town. A second, incomplete specimen was also discovered in the Trepassey Formation of Burnt Point, Bonavista Peninsula.

The generic name Haootia is derived from the Beothuk word Haoot, meaning "demon," to signify the striking appearance of the holotype. The specific name quadriformis is said to be derived from Latin quadri, meaning "fourfold", and formis, for "form", relating to the quadrilateral symmetry of the body. The proper word in classical Latin for "fourfold" is actually quadruplex, while forma is the proper word in classical Latin for "form".

Description 

Haootia quadriformis is uniquely different from any other Ediacaran fossil so far discovered in that it consists of bundles of fibres that have been identified as muscles. The entire body is in a broadly four-fold symmetrical arrangement. Thus the overall body organisation conforms to the key features of modern cnidarians. The fossil measures 56×37 mm in diameter. It indicates it is a soft-bodied animal having an appearance of a smooth discoidal structure connected by a relatively short stem to a quadrate body comprising numerous and regularly aligned linear fibres. The fibres, which are similar in pattern to parallelly arranged muscle fibres, extend laterally across the body, linking adjacent corners. The fibres extend beyond each corner to form an elongate branch, which is divided into smaller dichotomous branches. Smaller branches also arise from the lateral margins of the quadrate body, and also form dichotomously branched fibres.

See also
 List of Ediacaran genera

References

External links 
560-Million-Year-Old Fossil Provides Earliest Evidence of Muscles
Newfoundland fossil is earliest evidence of muscled animals
Animals first flex their muscles
Newfoundland fossil is oldest with muscles

Prehistoric cnidarian genera
Ediacaran life
Ediacaran Newfoundland and Labrador
Fossils of Canada
Prehistoric animal enigmatic taxa
Fossil taxa described in 2014
Paleontology in Newfoundland and Labrador